Mačvanska Mitrovica (Serbian Cyrillic: Мачванска Митровица) is a town located in the Sremska Mitrovica municipality, in the Srem District of Serbia. It is situated in the Autonomous Province of Vojvodina. The town has a Serb ethnic majority and its population numbering 3,873 people (2011 census).

Name
Its name means "Mitrovica of Mačva" (Mitrovica of Srem and Mitrovica of Kosovo also exist). In Serbian, the town is known as Mačvanska Mitrovica (Мачванска Митровица), in Croatian as Mačvanska Mitrovica, and in Hungarian as Szenternye. Other Serbian names used for the town include Srpska Mitrovica (Српска Митровица), Mala Mitrovica (Мала Митровица), and Mitrovica (Митровица).

Geography

Together with the neighbouring villages of Noćaj, Salaš Noćajski, Radenković, Ravnje and Zasavica II, the town of Mačvanska Mitrovica is the only town in Vojvodina located in the Mačva region, i.e. on the right bank of the river Sava, and thus on the Balkan Peninsula.

Notable residents
Former professional footballer Nikola Budišić was born in the town

Demographics

Ethnic groups (2002 census):
Serbs = 3,621
Romani = 87
Croats = 21
Yugoslavs = 14
Hungarians = 10
others.

Historical population

1921: 220
1931: 567
1948: 705
1953: 869
1961: 1,408
1971: 3,357
1981: 3,661
1991: 3,788
2002: 3,896

See also
List of places in Serbia
List of cities, towns and villages in Vojvodina

References

Slobodan Ćurčić, Broj stanovnika Vojvodine, Novi Sad, 1996.

Sremska Mitrovica
Populated places in Srem District
Mačva
Towns in Serbia